Johannes Jährig (17 March 1747 in Herrnhaag – 26 June 1795 in Saint Petersburg) was a German Mongolist and translator of Tibetan and Mongolian texts.

References 

1747 births
1795 deaths
People from Büdingen
Linguists from Germany
German orientalists
Mongolists
German male non-fiction writers